Reynante Hofileña Abellana (born September 2, 1962), professionally known as Rey "PJ" Abellana, is a Filipino actor who is best known for his portrayal as PJ in the Philippine TV series Anna Liza in the 1980s. He married Rea Reyes, his co-star in Anna Liza but has since annulled their marriage. One of their children is Filipina actress Carla Abellana.

Filmography

Film

Television

References

External links
 

1962 births
Living people
Male actors from Davao del Sur
People from Davao City

Filipino male film actors
Filipino male television actors
GMA Network personalities
ABS-CBN personalities